Yeakle's Mill Bridge is a historic metal Pratt pony truss bridge carrying State Route 3026 (Mill Road) across Little Cove Creek in Warren Township, Franklin County, Pennsylvania. It was constructed in 1887–1888.

It was listed on the National Register of Historic Places in 1988.

See also
List of bridges documented by the Historic American Engineering Record in Pennsylvania

References

External links

Historic American Engineering Record (HAER) No. PA-591, "Yeakle Mill Bridge," 9 photos, 3 color transparencies, 5 measured drawings, 10 data pages, and 2 photo caption pages

Road bridges on the National Register of Historic Places in Pennsylvania
Bridges completed in 1888
Bridges in Franklin County, Pennsylvania
National Register of Historic Places in Franklin County, Pennsylvania
Metal bridges in the United States
Truss bridges in the United States